Pallavolo Scandicci is an Italian women's volleyball club based in Scandicci that plays in the Serie A1, known also by its sponsored name Savino del Bene Scandicci

Previous names
Due to sponsorship, the club have competed under the following names:
 Savino Del Bene Scandicci (2012–present)
 Pallavolo Scandicci  (Past)

History
The club was founded in 2012, when the company Savino Del Bene, who has been investing in women's volleyball since 2009, joined the women's first team of Unione Pallavolo Scandicci. The club started at Serie B1 in the 2012–13 season, reaching promotion to Serie A2 by the end of the season. After one season at Serie A2, the club reached the highest Italian league, the Serie A1, in 2014.

In 2017/18 and 2018/19 season Italia Serie A1, the team won their best result after they promoted to Serie A1, they finished at third place.

In 2022, the club won 2021–22 CEV Women's Challenge Cup champion and promoted to Women's CEV Cup in 2022/23 season.

Team 
Season 2022–2023

Current coaching staff

Position Main (Current Season)

Notable Players

  Judith Pietersen（2015－2016）
  Bahar Toksoy（2015－2016）
  Floortje Meijners（2016－2017）
  Isabelle Haak（2017－2019）
  Jovana Stevanović（2018－2020）
  Tatiana Kosheleva（2019）
  Lonneke Slöetjes（2019－2020）
  Samantha Bricio（2019－2020）
  Agnieszka Kąkolewska（2019－2020）
  Magdalena Stysiak（2019－2021）
  Mina Popović（2020－2021）
  Natalia Pereira（2021－2022）
  Ana Beatriz Corrêa（2021－2022）
  Louisa Lippmann（2021－2022）
  Brenda Castillo（2021－）
  Haleigh Washington（2022－）
  Zhu Ting（2022－）
  Yao Di（2022－）
  Yvon Beliën（2022－）
  Yana Shcherban（2022－）

Honours

International competitions
  CEV Challenge Cup: 1
2022

References

External links

Official website 

Italian women's volleyball clubs
Volleyball clubs established in 2012
2012 establishments in Italy
Sport in Tuscany
Serie A1 (women's volleyball) clubs